The men's triple jump event at the 2016 African Championships in Athletics was held on 23 June in Kings Park Stadium.

Results

References

2016 African Championships in Athletics
Triple jump at the African Championships in Athletics